The 2020 24 Hours of Spa (also known as Total 24 Hours of Spa for sponsorship reasons) was the 72nd running of the 24 Hours of Spa. It took place on 22–25 October 2020. Although it was previously scheduled to held on 25–26 July, it was announced on 15 April that the race would be postponed due to the COVID-19 pandemic.

Background
The 72nd running of the 24 Hours of Spa took place on 22–25 October 2020. It was previously scheduled to held on 25–26 July, but in March the race was postponed to October due to the COVID-19 pandemic. This will be the first time that the race will be held in October. The race was set to be unique as it would run for a 25 hours duration due to the race being held on the weekend when the clocks change. However, this idea was pulled when it became clear that the event was not permitted to allow spectators to the race. The race will be the third round of the GT World Challenge Europe Endurance Cup and also the third round of the Intercontinental GT Challenge. The official test days took place on the 29 and 30 September. The GT4 European, Lamborghini Super Trofeo, Formula Renault Eurocup and TCR Europe series will all run support races at the event.

Following practice and qualifying track limits was an issue. Drivers were told initially that only track limits would be enforced at the Eau Rouge sequence. However due to "exaggerated abuse" including running out of the bus stop chicane across 10 metres of tarmac runoff up to the barrier, drivers were told that the white lines were the limit of the track and that the cars must remain in contact with the track. The exceptions were at Eau Rouge, Speaker's or No Name Corner, Blanchimont and the exit of the Bus Stop where the drivers were permitted to use the kerbs beyond the white line. Drivers were allowed 3 infringements of the rule before being given a drive through penalty. Any driver gaining an advantage and not giving it back would be penalised 5 or 10 seconds at the next pit stop. The warnings would be reset every 6 hours.

Results

Super Pole

Race
Class winners denoted in bold and with

References 

2020
24 Hours of Spa
24 Hours of Spa
24 Hours of Spa
24 Hours of Spa
S